Mount Warburton Pike is a mountain on Saturna Island in the Gulf Islands of British Columbia, Canada.  It is the highest summit in the Gulf Islands, other than Saltspring Island, and is part of the Gulf Islands National Park Reserve.

Name origin
The mountain is named for Warburton Pike (1861–1915), who alienated land on Saturna in 1886 and whose ranch included the mountain.  Pike was an explorer, sportsman and author and wrote a book on his experiences in the Canadian North, The Barren Ground of Northern Canada.  Pike's death was untimely and tragic.  After returning to Britain to enlist for World War I and, being refused because he was too old, died by suicide.  The summit and a rock in Active Pass were named for him, and a memorial was erected at Porter Landing in the Dease Lake region, where he had ventured in his years in B.C. The monument was donated by his friends Osborne Beauclerk, 12th Duke of St Albans and Marshall Latham Bond.

References

History of British Columbia
Warburton Pike
Landforms of the Gulf Islands
Cowichan Land District